Rajavaliya (line of kings) is an ancient chronicle of Sri Lanka. It contains the history of King Vijaya to King Vimaladharmasuriya ΙΙ. It is the only chronicle which contains continuous history of Sri Lanka written in Sinhalese language. 

Although there were so many other ancient palm-leaf manuscript codices dated before Rajavaliya, also known as Puskolapoth written in prehistoric Sinhalese language on the history of ancient kings of Sri Lanka and the advanced technologies used by them, Rajavaliya is still considered as the first record of Sri Lankan history because Sri Lankans never had the opportunity to refer to these ancient manuscripts or to later translate them into their language to be used as references while recording their history as those were taken away from the nation's custody when they were discovered in archaeological excavations conducted in historical sites and ancient Buddhist temples across old Ceylon during the era of British rulers. Most of these very important manuscripts are now being held at the British Museum.

References

External links 

Sri Lankan chronicles
Sri Lankan literature